Flute, Brass, Vibes and Percussion is an album by American jazz flautist Herbie Mann recorded in 1960 for the Verve label.

Reception

Allmusic awarded the album 4½ stars stating "In 1960, flutist Herbie Mann put together a very interesting band that was in its brief existence (before Mann's interests shifted elsewhere) one of the top in Afro-Cuban jazz" and called the album "quite underrated and is one of the finest of Mann's long career".

Track listing
All compositions by Herbie Mann except as indicated
 "Dearly Beloved" (Jerome Kern, Johnny Mercer) - 4:39 	
 "You Stepped Out of a Dream" (Nacio Herb Brown, Gus Kahn) - 6:36	
 "I'll Remember April" (Gene de Paul, Patricia Johnston, Don Raye) - 8:32 	
 "A Ritual" - 7:30 	
 "Fife 'n Tambourine Corps" - 2:02
 "Autumn Leaves" (Joseph Kosma, Jacques Prévert, Johnny Mercer) - 9:51

Personnel 
Herbie Mann - flute
Doc Cheatham, Leo Ball, Jerome Kail, Ziggy Schatz - trumpet 
Johnny Rae - vibraphone
Knobby Totah - bass
Rudy Collins - drums
Ray Barretto - congas
Ray Mantilla - bongos

References 

1961 albums
Herbie Mann albums
Verve Records albums